The 1977 Irish general election to the 21st Dáil was held on Thursday, 16 June, following the dissolution of the 20th Dáil on 25 May by President Patrick Hillery on the request of Taoiseach Liam Cosgrave. The general election took place in 42 Dáil constituencies throughout Ireland for 148 seats in Dáil Éireann, the house of representatives of the Oireachtas, an increase of four seats with a significant revision of constituencies under the Electoral (Amendment) Act 1974. The election is regarded as a pivotal point in twentieth-century Irish politics. Jack Lynch led Fianna Fáil to a landslide election win, clearly defeating the outgoing Fine Gael–Labour government.

The 21st Dáil met at Leinster House on 5 July to nominate the Taoiseach for appointment by the president and to approve the appointment of a new government of Ireland. Jack Lynch was appointed Taoiseach, forming the 15th Government of Ireland, a single-party majority Fianna Fáil government. It was the last election to result in a single-party majority government.

Campaign

In spite of having faced some controversial issues during its term of office, the ruling Fine Gael–Labour Party coalition looked set to defy political history by winning an unprecedented second term. This belief was further augmented following the so-called "Tullymander" of parliamentary constituencies. This refers to the Minister for Local Government James Tully, and his scheme of redrawing constituencies across the country to maximise the vote for the coalition partners. For example, in Dublin there were thirteen three-seat constituencies. It was hoped that the coalition partners would win two of the seats, leaving Fianna Fáil with only one seat. A similar tactic was used in rural areas where the party was at its strongest.

As a result of this, Fianna Fáil and its leader Jack Lynch believed that they could not win the general election. The party drew up a manifesto which offered the electorate a string of financial and economic "sweeteners", encouraging them to vote for Fianna Fáil. Some of the promises that were offered included the abolition of rates on houses, the abolition of car tax and the promise of reducing unemployment to under 100,000. Lynch agreed to the manifesto because he believed that the party needed something dramatic if it were to win the election.

Both The Irish Times and The Irish Press, which was then edited by Tim Pat Coogan, were extremely critical of the government's curtailment of freedom of speech and in particular of the Minister for Posts and Telegraphs Conor Cruise O'Brien, who used these restrictions against the PIRA.

The Fianna Fáil campaign was based on the American model. Inspired by director of elections Séamus Brennan, Lynch travelled the length and breadth of the country, music blaring, accompanied by his followers. His popularity was at its highest, and it soon became clear he might win the election. Lynch's popularity was a big electoral asset. The party slogan "Bring Back Jack" even played on Lynch's huge appeal. But the monetary sweeteners were Fianna Fáil's biggest asset.

In contrast to Fianna Fáil, the government parties of Fine Gael and the Labour Party fought the general election on their record in government. The redrawing of the constituency boundaries also gave them hope for success, however they offered little to the electorate except for the policies they had been pursuing for the previous four years.

While towards the end of the campaign Fianna Fáil were expected to win the general election, nobody predicted the scale of that victory. An unprecedented nine-seat majority in Dáil Éireann for Fianna Fáil saw the National Coalition swept from power in what was at the time the biggest political hurricane in Irish history. Only Éamon de Valera had ever done better, but only once out of 13 elections. Following the election, the leaders of Fine Gael and the Labour Party, Liam Cosgrave and Brendan Corish resigned as leaders of their respective parties, the first occasion in which a defeated Taoiseach or Tánaiste had done so.

"Tullymandering" and the unprecedented sweeteners were the cause for the scale of the coalition's defeat. The new government established an independent commission to revise constituency boundaries.

Result

|}
Independents include Independent Fianna Fáil (13,824 votes, 1 seat) and the Community group in Dublin (9,427 votes).

Voting summary

Seats summary

Government formation
Fianna Fáil formed a majority government, the 15th Government of Ireland led by Jack Lynch as Taoiseach. In December 1979, Charles Haughey succeeded Lynch as Taoiseach, forming the 16th Government of Ireland.

Membership changes

First time TDs
42 TDs were elected for the first time:

Bertie Ahern
Kit Ahern
Niall Andrews
Liam Aylward
John Boland
Gerard Brady
Vincent Brady
Barry Cogan
Hugh Conaghan
Michael Joe Cosgrave
Michael D'Arcy
Síle de Valera
Austin Deasy
Seán Doherty
Eddie Filgate
Jim Fitzsimons
Pádraig Flynn
Joe Fox
John Horgan
Michael Keating
Seán Keegan
Patrick Kerrigan
Timothy Killeen
Mark Killilea Jnr
Liam Lawlor
Eileen Lemass
Tom Leonard
Terry Leyden
Michael Lipper
John Mannion Jnr
Charlie McCreevy
Jim Mitchell
P. J. Morley
William O'Brien
Martin O'Donoghue
Rory O'Hanlon
Jim O'Keeffe
Paddy O'Toole
Ruairi Quinn
Albert Reynolds
Joe Walsh
Michael Woods

Outgoing TDs
Liam Burke (Lost seat)
Ruairí Brugha (Lost seat)
Justin Keating (Lost seat)
Conor Cruise O'Brien (Lost seat)
Seán Flanagan (Lost seat)
Richard Gogan (Lost seat)
Gus Healy (Retired)
Brigid Hogan-O'Higgins (Lost seat)
Eugene Timmons (Lost seat)

See also
Members of the 14th Seanad
Gerrymandering in Ireland

Notes

References

Further reading
 

General election, 1977
1977
21st Dáil
June 1977 events in Europe
1977 elections in the Republic of Ireland